Ramiro Georgescu (born 1982) is a Romanian water polo player. At the 2012 Summer Olympics, he competed for the Romania men's national water polo team in the men's event. He is 6 ft 4 inches tall.

References

External links
 

Romanian male water polo players
1982 births
Living people
Olympic water polo players of Romania
Water polo players at the 2012 Summer Olympics